Songs from The Capeman is the ninth solo studio album by Paul Simon, released in 1997. His first new studio album of original materials in seven years, it contains Simon's own performances of songs from the Broadway musical he wrote and produced called The Capeman augmented by members of the original cast. The songs retell the story of Salvador Agron, who was known as the "Capeman". A departure musically from his earlier work, the album features doo-wop, rock 'n' roll and Puerto Rican rhythms and a number of songs contain explicit lyrics, a first for Simon. The stage show was a commercial flop, losing $11 million, and the album did not sell well. It peaked at number 42 on the Billboard 200, the lowest chart position in Simon's career.

Track listing
All songs written by Paul Simon, with lyrics co-written by Derek Walcott.

Side one

Side two

2004 reissue bonus tracks

Personnel 
 Paul Simon – lead vocals (1-6, 8, 10, 11, 12), acoustic guitar (2, 3, 4, 8-12), backing vocals (3, 4, 6), hi-string guitar (4, 7)
 Orinete Lopez – organ (1), flute (2, 7, 9), horn arrangements (9), Fender Rhodes (12)
 Oscar Hernández – acoustic piano (2, 5, 7, 9), synthesizers (2, 4), celesta (4), glockenspiel (4), vibraphone (4), horn arrangements (5)
 Horace Ott – acoustic piano (4, 8)
 Paul Griffin – acoustic piano (6)
 Michael Ramos – accordion (12)
 Vincent Nguini – electric guitar (2), guitars (4, 9, 12)
 Edgardo Miranda – cuatro (2, 3)
 Nelson González – tres (2)
 Paul Livant – guitars (4)
 Wally Richardson – guitars (6)
 Saturnino Laboy – acoustic guitar (7)
 Diomedes Matos – acoustic guitar (7)
 Arlen Roth – guitars (8, 10, 11, 12), acoustic guitar solo (12)
 Harper Simon – guitars (8, 10, 11), harmonica (8)
 Steve Cropper – guitars (9)
 Robby Turner – pedal steel guitar (12)
 John Beal – bass (2, 4)
 Bernie Minoso – bass (5)
 Jay Leonhart – bass (6)
 Rubén Rodriguez – bass (7, 9)
 Tony Garnier – bass (8, 10, 11)
 Bakithi Kumalo – bass (12)
 Robby Ameen – drums (4, 9), "guitar case" kick drum (4)
 Richard Crooks – drums (6)
 Shannon Ford – drums (8, 10, 11, 12)
 Bobby Allende – bongos (2), cymbals (2), bell tree (4)
 Marc Quiñones – congas (2), timbales (2), cua (2)
 Milton Cardona – backing vocals (4, 5), bongos (7), claves (7), maracas (7), congas (9), güiro (9)
 Eddie Montalvo – congas (5)
 Pablo Nuñez – bongos (5), cowbell (5)
 Johnny Andrews – timbales (5)
 Jimmy Sabater – congas (6), cowbell (6)
 Errol "Crusher" Bennett – shaker (12)
 Marcia Butler – oboe (2)
 David Mann – baritone saxophone (3), tenor saxophone (3)
 Bill Holloman – tenor saxophone (4, 12)
 Pablo Galigero – baritone saxophone (5), bass clarinet (9)
 Mitch Frohman – tenor saxophone (5)
 Chris Eminizer – tenor saxophone (6)
 Bob Franceschini – soprano saxophone (9)
 Luis Lopéz – trombone (5)
 Ozzie Melendez – trombone (9)
 David "Piro" Rodriguez – first trumpet solo (2), trumpet (9)
 Ray Vega – second trumpet solo (2),  trumpet (5), trumpet solo (5)
 John Walsh – trumpet (5)
 Barry Danielian – flugelhorn (9)
 Stewart Rose – French horn (2)
 Julliet Haffner – violin (2), viola (9)
 Laura Bontrager – cello (7, 9)
 Krista Bennion Feeney – violin (9)
 Paul Peabody – violin (9)
 Stanley Silverman – orchestrations (2, 9), orchestra conductor (7)
 Karen Bernod – backing vocals (1, 3)
 Reginald "Briz" Brisbon – backing vocals (1, 3)
 Renee Connell-Adams – backing vocals (1, 3)
 Myrna Lynn Gomila – backing vocals (1, 4), harmony vocals (3)
 Derrick James – backing vocals (1, 3)
 Kia Jeffries – backing vocals (1, 3)
 DeWayne Snipe – backing vocals (1, 3)
 Ed Vasquez – backing vocals (1, 3)
 Ray De La Paz – backing vocals (2, 4)
 Nestor Sanchez – backing vocals (2)
 Danny Rivera – coro vocals (2)
 Marc Anthony – lead vocals (3, 9)
 Teana Rodriguez – harmony vocals (3), backing vocals (4)
 Angelo Aponte – backing vocals (5)
 David Davilla – backing vocals (5)
 Hans Giraldo – backing vocals (5)
 Louie Marrero – backing vocals (5)
 Angel Ramirez – backing vocals (5)
 Hechter Ubarry – backing vocals (5)
 Robert Vargas – backing vocals (5)
 Frankie Negron – falsetto lead vocals (6)
 Bobby Bright – backing vocals (6)
 Sean Pulley – backing vocals (6)
 Dionte Sutton – backing vocals (6)
 Trent Sutton – backing vocals (6)
 Ednita Nazario – lead vocals (7)
 Ruben Blades – lead vocals (9)
 Victor Miles Levy, Jr. – interviewer (11)
 Sara Ramirez – vocals (12)

References

Paul Simon albums
1997 albums
Albums produced by Roy Halee
Warner Records albums

fi:Songs from The Capeman